588 may refer to:
 The year 588
 The 588th Night Bomber Regiment, a World War II Soviet women-only combat regiment.
 588 Achilles, an asteroid.
 Cheongnyangni 588, a red light district in Seoul, South Korea.
 Meadow Lake No. 588, Saskatchewan, a rural municipality in the Canadian province of Saskatchewan.
 Texas House Bill 588

Roads:
 Pennsylvania Route 588
 Highway 588 (Ontario)
 Ohio State Route 588